Albert Huser (born 26 May 1936) is a German weightlifter. He competed in the men's middleweight event at the 1968 Summer Olympics.

References

1936 births
Living people
German male weightlifters
Olympic weightlifters of West Germany
Weightlifters at the 1968 Summer Olympics
Sportspeople from Mannheim